Vaucluse (or  ) is a department in the southeastern French region of Provence-Alpes-Côte d'Azur. It had a population of 561,469 as of 2019. The department's prefecture is Avignon.

It is named after a spring, the Fontaine de Vaucluse, one of the largest karst springs in the world. The name Vaucluse itself derives from the Latin  ("closed valley") as the valley ends in a cliff face from which the spring emanates.

History
Vaucluse was created on 12 August 1793 out of parts of the departments of Bouches-du-Rhône, Drôme and Basses-Alpes, later renamed Alpes-de-Haute-Provence. The then rural department was, like the nearby city of Lyon, a hotbed of the French Resistance in World War II.

Geography

Vaucluse is bordered by the Rhône to the west and the Durance to the south. Mountains occupy a significant proportion of the eastern half of the department, with Mont Ventoux (1,912 m), also known as "the Giant of Provence", dominating the landscape. Other important mountain ranges include the Dentelles de Montmirail, the Monts de Vaucluse and the Luberon.

Fruit and vegetables are cultivated in great quantities in the lower-lying parts of the department, on one of the most fertile plains in Southern France. The Vaucluse department has a rather large exclave within the Drôme department, the canton of Valréas (Enclave des Papes).

Vaucluse is also known for its karst, including the karst spring Fontaine de Vaucluse after which "Vauclusian Risings" are named.

Principal towns

The most populous commune is Avignon, the prefecture. As of 2019, there are 6 communes with more than 20,000 inhabitants:

Demographics 

Population development since 1801:

Politics

Departmental Council

Following the 2021 departmental election, Dominique Santoni of The Republicans was elected President of the Departmental Council. She succeeded Maurice Chabert, who had held the office since 2015.

The Departmental Council of Vaucluse has 34 seats. The Left Front (FG) currently has 2 seats, the Socialist Party (PS) has 7, Europe Ecology – The Greens (EELV) has 3, the miscellaneous right (DVD) has 2, The Republicans (LR) have 10, the National Rally has 6 and a local party, the Ligue du Sud (LS), has 4.

Members of the National Assembly
During the 2017 legislative election, Vaucluse elected the following representatives to the National Assembly:

*On 21 July 2017, Brune Poirson resigned from office to join the Second Philippe government as Secretary of State to the Minister for the Ecological and Inclusive Transition. She was replaced in the National Assembly by Adrien Morenas.

**Jacques Bompard resigned in August 2017 to become Mayor of Orange. He was replaced by Marie-France Lorho.

Tourism

See also
 Arrondissements of the Vaucluse department
 Communes of the Vaucluse department
 Cantons of the Vaucluse department

References

External links

 Website of the Departmental Council 
 Prefecture website

 
States and territories established in 1793
1793 establishments in France
Departments of Provence-Alpes-Côte d'Azur